Pyruvate dehydrogenase is a type of enzyme.

Pyruvate dehydrogenase may specifically refer to:
Pyruvate dehydrogenase (cytochrome)
Pyruvate dehydrogenase (lipoamide) alpha 1
Pyruvate dehydrogenase (lipoamide) alpha 2
Pyruvate dehydrogenase (lipoamide) beta
Pyruvate dehydrogenase (quinone)
Pyruvate dehydrogenase (NADP+)